is a Japanese adult visual novel video game developer and brand used by . They also have a sub-brand, Windmill Oasis, which produces high-quality games with 2D animation.

Games developed

Windmill
(2002) Yuibashi
(2004) Cradle Song -Kinou ni Kanaderu Asu no Uta-
(2004) Mahou to H no Kankei.
(2005) Chotto Sunao ni Donburi Kanjō
(2007) Tsunagaru★Bangle
(2008) TsunaBan ♥ Love Mix
(2010) Iro ni Ide ni Keri Waga Koi wa
(2011) Hyper→Highspeed→Genius
(2012) Kamigakari Cross Heart!
(2013) Hyper→Highspeed→Genius Megami no Shuuen
(2015) Unlucky Re:Birth/Reverse
(2017) Hyper→Highspeed→Genius Anniversary Pack

Windmill Oasis
(2005) Happiness!
(2006) Happiness! Re:Lucks
(2009) Shukufuku no Campanella -la campanella della benedizione-
(2010) Shukusai no Campanella!
(2012) Witch's Garden
(2014) Happiness! Emotion
(2014) Harukaze Sensation!
(2016) Wizards Complex

External links
Official Website 

Video game publishing brands